Harry Oliver Michael Gouldstone (born 26 March 2001) is an English cricketer. He made his first-class debut on 6 September 2020, for Northamptonshire in the 2020 Bob Willis Trophy.

References

External links
 

2001 births
Living people
English cricketers
Northamptonshire cricketers
Sportspeople from Kettering